The Junior Monaco Kart Cup was a kart racing event ruled by the CIK-FIA and organized by the Automobile Club de Monaco, it took place each year in Monaco.

The event see young drivers compete with KF3 karts, a class for top drivers aged 12 to 15. The course circuit follows the lower part of the famous Formula One track, in a large section of the port, from Tabac corner, round the swimming pool, and on to the Rascasse before entering the F1 track's pit lane. A ramp and a hairpin connect this part of the track back to the port section.

Winners

References

External links
 Monaco Kart Cup – List of Winners - Automobile Club de Monaco (ACM)
 CIK-FIA – International Karting Governing Body
 1990 – 2008 CIK Results

Kart racing events
Motorsport in Monaco